Catocala lacrymosa, the tearful underwing, is a moth of the family Erebidae. It is found from Massachusetts and Connecticut south to Florida, west to Texas and eastern Oklahoma and north to Illinois and Michigan and into southern Ontario.

The wingspan is 60–82 mm. Adults are on wing from July to September depending on the location. There is one generation per year.

The larvae feed on Carya species.

References

External links
Species info

lacrymosa
Moths of North America
Moths described in 1852